Peter Probst is a former Swiss slalom canoeist who competed in the 1970s. He won a bronze medal in the C-2 team event at the 1979 ICF Canoe Slalom World Championships in Jonquière.

References

Swiss male canoeists
Living people
Year of birth missing (living people)
Medalists at the ICF Canoe Slalom World Championships